Conoderinae is a subfamily of true weevils in the beetle family Curculionidae. There are more than 210 genera in 15 tribes, and about 2,400 described species in Conoderinae.

See also
 List of Conoderinae genera

References

Further reading

External links

 

Weevils